Xu Jun (born 29 May 1995) is a Chinese footballer who currently plays for Shanghai Shenhua in the Chinese Super League.

Club career
Xu Jun started his professional football career in 2012 when he joined Jiangsu HHU for the 2012 China League Two campaign. Failing to join Jiangsu Sainty, he moved to another Chinese Super League club Shanghai Shenhua in July 2015. On 25 October 2015, he made his debut for Shenhua in the 2015 Chinese Super League against Liaoning Whowin, coming on as a substitute for Wang Yun in the 67th minute.

Career statistics 
Statistics accurate as of match played 31 December 2020.

References

External links

1995 births
Living people
Chinese footballers
Footballers from Jiangsu
Sportspeople from Yangzhou
Shanghai Shenhua F.C. players
Chinese Super League players
Expatriate footballers in Spain
Chinese expatriate sportspeople in Spain
Association football midfielders